Captain Nell is a 1911 silent drama short directed by Edwin S. Porter. It was produced by Edison Manufacturing Company and distributed by General Film Company.

Cast
Miriam Nesbitt - Captain Nell of the Salvation Army
Charles Ogle - Mr. Randolph, Harry's Father
William West - The Confidential Clerk
Guy Coombs - Harry Randolph, the Son

References

External links
 Captain Nell at IMDb.com

1911 short films
1911 films
Edison Manufacturing Company films
American black-and-white films
American silent short films
Films directed by Edwin S. Porter
1910s American films